Christian Breslauer is an American music video director. He is known for his work with Lil Nas X, Doja Cat, Lizzo and SZA. Breslauer's music video for Industry Baby was nominated for Video of the Year at the 2022 MTV Video Music Awards, but lost to Taylor Swift's All Too Well: The Short Film.

Selected music videos

Awards and nominations

References

External links
 
 

Living people
American music video directors